The Junior women's race at the 1996 IAAF World Cross Country Championships was held in Stellenbosch, South Africa, at the Danie Craven Stadium on March 23, 1996.  A preview on the event was given in the Herald, and a report in The New York Times.

Complete results, medallists, 
 and the results of British athletes were published.

Race results

Junior women's race (4.22 km)

Individual

†: Krista Ranta-Pere of  came in 90th in 16:00 min, Savita Birajdar of  98th in 16:12 min, and Lakshmaiah Manjula of  99th in  16:16 min, but all three were disqualified.

Teams

Note: Athletes in parentheses did not score for the team result

Participation
An unofficial count yields the participation of 115 athletes from 30 countries in the Junior women's race.  This is in agreement with the official numbers as published.

 (4)
 (4)
 (4)
 (6)
 (3)
 (4)
 (1)
 (1)
 (6)
 (5)
 (6)
 (2)
 (4)
 (6)
 (6)
 (5)
 (1)
 (1)
 (2)
 (2)
 (1)
 (6)
 (4)
 (6)
 (6)
 (2)
 (5)
 (6)
 (1)
 (5)

See also
 1996 IAAF World Cross Country Championships – Senior men's race
 1996 IAAF World Cross Country Championships – Junior men's race
 1996 IAAF World Cross Country Championships – Senior women's race

References

Junior women's race at the World Athletics Cross Country Championships
IAAF World Cross Country Championships
1996 in women's athletics
1996 in youth sport